Columbian High School is  comprehensive public high school in Tiffin, Ohio, United States.  It is the only public high school in the Tiffin City School District.  Their nickname is the Tornadoes.  A long time member of the Northern Ohio League (1954-2017), Tiffin Columbian joined the Sandusky Bay Conference in 2017. The school has 850 students.  The school was founded in 1859 and the current building was constructed in 1959.  The building was named for the 1893 World's Columbian Exposition, the world's fair that celebrated the 400th anniversary of Christopher Columbus' arrival to the New World.  Forrest Trisler is the school principal.

Columbian's Frost-Kalnow Stadium is a 4,500 seat facility that is used by Columbian and Tiffin University.

Curriculum
Columbian High School offers a comprehensive curriculum. Several Advanced Placement classes are offered, including AP Psychology, AP U.S. History, AP Calculus, AP Biology, AP English Language & Composition, AP English Literature & Composition, and more. The school also offers two foreign language courses, Spanish and Mandarin Chinese. AP classes that aren't offered can be taken online through the Virtual High School Collaborative.

Students at Columbian can participate in the College Credit Plus program, which allows them to attend classes at Heidelberg University, Tiffin University, Terra Community College, and more, in order to earn college credit.

External links

Notes and references

High schools in Seneca County, Ohio
Public high schools in Ohio